The National Museum of the Resistance is a museum located in the municipality of Anderlecht in Brussels, Belgium. The museum traces the history of the Belgian Resistance and German occupation of Belgium during World War II. It is served by Clemenceau metro station on lines 2 and 6 of the Brussels Metro.

Museum
The museum seeks to raise awareness of the role of the Belgian Resistance during both World Wars and preserves document and artifacts  relating to the period. The museum also touches on the German occupation, Holocaust and deportations of prisoners of war during the conflict.

It is housed in the building in which the Faux Soir was produced during the German occupation and is supported by the Front de l'Indépendance association.

Gallery

References

Links

 

Museums in Brussels
World War II museums in Belgium
Belgian Resistance